Jason McCoombs (born April 24, 1993) is a Canadian sprint canoeist.

His home club is the Banook Canoe Club in Dartmouth, Nova Scotia, Canada. As a 16-year-old at the 2009 Canada Games McCoombs represented Nova Scotia where he won three gold medals, two individually in the 200 and 500 m, as well as one in the C-2 1000 m. He won another three gold medals at the 2010 Junior Pan American Canoe Championships in Mexico in the C-1 200m, 500m and the C-2 200m. In addition he won two silver medals in the C-1 1000m and C-4 1000m.

McCoombs competed at the 2012 Summer Olympics in the C-1 200 metres event placing 12th. At the 2013 Under-23 World Championships in Niagara he claimed the silver medal in the C-1 200m.

References

External links
 CanoeKayak Canada profile of Jason McCoombs

1993 births
Canadian male canoeists
Living people
Olympic canoeists of Canada
Sportspeople from Dartmouth, Nova Scotia
Canoeists at the 2012 Summer Olympics
Pan American Games silver medalists for Canada
Pan American Games medalists in canoeing
Canoeists at the 2015 Pan American Games
Medalists at the 2015 Pan American Games